Jim and pirates Blom is a 1987 Swedish adventure film directed by Hans Alfredson. The main roles are Johan Akerblom, Ewa Fröling and Jan Malmsjö. The film premiered in Sweden on February 12, 1987. The film was premiered on February 12, 1987, at the cinema Rio in Tomelilla. The film's title is related to the cartoon series "Terry and the pirates", which have also been called "Jim and the Pirates". The film stars are Johan Åkerblom, Ewa Fröling, and Jan Malmsjö

Plot 
The film is about the 8-year-old boy Jim who lives in Malmö and whose father recently died. But the ghost of his father comes back and begins to visit him. Later, the ghost disappears and Jim begins to fantasize that he is the captain of a pirate ship and out on an adventure with his mother, father and pirate Eskil Blom.

Cast 
Jonas Åkerblom - Jim

Ewa Fröling - Siv, Jim's Mother

Jan Malmsjö - Ove Bengtsson

Mats Bergman - Dummer-Jöns

Stig Olin - Potatis-Algot

Stellan Skarsgård - Gustav, Jim's Father

Hans Alfredson - Kolavippen

Lena T. Hansson - Inez

Jesper Danielsson

Sten Hellström

Carl Billquist

Mats Ingerdal

See also 
 1987 in film

References

External links 

1987 films
1980s adventure comedy films
Swedish adventure comedy films
1980s Swedish films